This list of royal saints and martyrs enumerates Christian monarchs, other royalty, and nobility who have been beatified or canonized, or who are otherwise venerated as or conventionally given the appellation of "saint" or "martyr". Their names are in English and, where known, in their own language. When the status of a nominee is dubious the whole entry is italicized. Popes are not included in this list, unless they came from nobility themselves. Although they may be considered sovereigns, a list of Papal Saints is enumerated elsewhere.

Monarchs

This section enumerates Christian sovereigns, as opposed to mere consorts, who are enumerated in "Other royalty and nobility" below.

Saints

Roman Catholic Beati, Venerabili, and Servants of God

The Roman Catholic Church classifies various holy persons who have not been canonized as saints in the lesser categories of beati, venerabili, and servants of God. These titles indicate grades on the path to canonization in that church.

Other royalty and nobility

This section enumerates Christian royalty, including consorts but not sovereigns, and nobility. Christian sovereigns, while also "royalty", are exclusively enumerated in "Monarchs" above.

Saints

Æbbe of Coldingham, daughter of Æthelfrith, king of Bernicia
Ælfflæd of Whitby, daughter of Oswiu, king of Northumbria 
Ælfthryth of Crowland, daughter of Offa, king of Mercia
Æthelberht, Prince of Kent, martyred in 669
Æthelburh of Barking, sister of the Bishop of London, who was reputedly of Royal blood
Æthelburh of Faremoutiers, daughter of Anna, king of East Anglia
Æthelburh of Kent, daughter of Æthelberht of Kent, queen-consort of Northumbria
Æthelburh of Wilton, Abbess of Wilton, half-sister of Egbert, king of Wessex
Æthelnoth, Archbishop of Canterbury, died 1038, of the House of Wessex
Æthelred, Prince of Kent, martyred in 669
Æthelthryth, Abbess, died 679, daughter of Anna, king of East Anglia
Æthelwine of Athelney, 7th century hermit, son of Cynegils, king of Wessex
Æthelwine of Lindsey, Bishop of Lindsey, born to English nobility
Æthelwold of Winchester, Bishop of Winchester, born to English nobility 
Æthelwynn, 10th century English noblewoman and textile artist 
Adela of Normandy, Countess of Blois, daughter of king William I of England and mother of king Stephen (Catholic)
Adelaide of Italy, empress-consort of Otto I, Holy Roman Emperor
Adelaide of Metz, mother of Conrad II, Holy Roman Emperor
Adela of France, daughter of king Robert II of France, wife of Baldwin V, Count of Flanders, mother-in-law of William the Conqueror (Catholic)
Afrelia, Princess of Powys, granddaughter of Vortigern, became a nun
Agnes of Bohemia, daughter of Otakar I of Bohemia, in Czech "Sv. Anežka Česka"
Aldwyn of Coln, Abbot of Partney, brother of Æthelwine of Lindsey, born to a noble family 
Alexandra Feodorovna of Russia (Alix of Hesse)
Alexei Nikolaevich of Russia
Aloysius Gonzaga, Italian noble who became Jesuit priest
Anastasia Nikolaevna of Russia
Anna of Kashin, wife of Russian Grand Prince Mikhail of Tver (Orthodox)
Arnulf of Metz, 7th century Bishop of Metz, ancestor of Charlemagne, and of noble family 
Ashkhen, Queen of Armenia and a member of the Arsacid dynasty by marriage to King Tiridates III of Armenia (Catholic) 
Avitus of Vienne, 5th century Bishop of Vienne, grandson of an unnamed Western Roman Emperor
Balthild, Queen of France and wife of King Clovis II, died 30 January 680 (Catholic)
Begga, daughter of Pepin of Landen and mother of Pepin of Herstal
Bertha of Kent, revered as a saint but not canonized
Blanche of Castile, queen consort of France
Bojan Enravota, Prince of Bulgaria
Boris, Prince of Kiev
Budoc, 6th century Breton saint, Bishop of Dol, reputedly grandson of Evan, king of Brest
Burgundofara, Foundress of Abbey of Faremoutiers, of Burgundian nobility 
Cadfrawd, perhaps known also as Adelphius, early Welsh saint, closely related to British royalty of the time
Cainnech of Aghaboe, 6th century Abbot, descended from Kings of Ulster
Canute Lavard, Danish prince, son of king Eric I of Denmark and ancestor of Danish monarchs.
Casimir, son of Casimir IV of Poland, known as "Saint Casimir of Poland" and "Saint Casimir Jagiełło", in Polish "Święty Kazimierz" (Catholic)
Cathróe of Metz, 10th century Abbot, born into the nobility 
Cedd, Bishop of London, died 664, probably from Northumbrian nobility 
Chad of Mercia, Bishop of York, died 672, probably from Northumbrian nobility 
Clotilde, daughter of Chilperic II of Burgundy, wife of Clovis I
Columba, 6th century Irish missionary, reputed to be great-great grandson of Niall, High King of Ireland
Constantine Constantinovich, Prince of Russia
Cunigunde of Luxemburg, wife of Henry II, in Luxembourgish "Helleg Kunigunde"
Darerca of Ireland, 5th century saint, supposedly married to Conan Meriadoc, king of Brittany
Dimitry (Dmitry) of Moscow
Dinar of Hereti, Georgian royal princess
Dunstan, Archbishop of Canterbury, died 988, son of Heorstan, a noble of Wessex
Edburga of Winchester, daughter of Edward the Elder
Edburga of Bicester, daughter of Penda, king of Mercia
Edburga of Minster-in-Thanet, or Heaburg, or Bugga, daughter of Centwine of Wessex
Edith of Wilton, English nun, a daughter of Edgar the Peaceful
Edmund of Scotland, son of Malcolm III of Scotland
Elgiva of Wessex, queen, wife of English king Edmund I and mother of another two kings.
Elizabeth Fyodorovna of Russia
Elisabeth of Hungary, wife of Ludwig IV of Thuringia (see above), in Hungarian "Árpádházi Szent Erzsébet" ("Saint Elizabeth of Árpád's Line") (Catholic)
Elizabeth of Portugal, daughter of Pedro III of Aragon, wife of Denis of Portugal, known as "Saint Queen Elizabeth" and "Saint Isabel of Portugal", in Portuguese "Rainha Santa Isabel" (Catholic)
Emeric of Hungary,  son of Stephen I of Hungary, in Hungarian "Szent Imre"
Emma of Hawaii, who helped to found the Anglican Church in Hawaii, United States (Anglican)
Ermenilda of Ely, 7th century Abbess, daughter of Eorcenberht, king of Kent
Eucherius of Lyon, 5th century Archbishop of Lyon, and Gallo-Roman aristocrat
Faro, 7th century Bishop of Meaux, of Burgundian nobility 
Fevronia of Murom, died 25 June 1228, Princess of Murom and wife of Peter of Murom. (Orthodox)
Gleb, Prince of Kiev
Gregory II, born into Roman nobility, died 731, a Pope of the Catholic Church
Gummarus, 8th century Belgian hermit, related to Pepin the Short, and married to noblewoman named Guinmarie
Hedwig of Andechs, daughter of Berthold III, Count of Tyrol, wife of Henry I of Poland, canonized 1267 as "Saint Hedwig of Andechs", in Polish "Św. Jadwiga Śląska"
Helena of Constantinople, Roman Empress, died circa 327, mother of Emperor Constantine I (see above)
Henwg, 6th century church builder, born into Welsh nobility 
Himelin, obscure Irish/Scottish saint, reputed to be brother of Rumbold and thereby son of a Scottish king
Igor Konstantinovich, Prince of Russia
Ingegerd of Sweden, Grand Princess of Kiev as wife of Yaroslav I the Wise, and Swedish princess as daughter of king Olof Skötkonung (Orthodox)
Ioann Konstantinovich, Prince of Russia
Irene of Hungary, Roman Empress, died 1134, consort of Emperor John II (Orthodox)
Isabelle of France, Princess of France, daughter of Louis VIII of France, younger sister of St. Louis of France (see above)
Jeanne of France, daughter of Louis XI of France, wife of Louis XII of France, known as "Saint Jeanne de Valois", in French "Ste Jeanne de France"
John Ogilvie, Scottish Martyr, descended from the noble Ogilvie family 
Juthwara, 6th century Virgin and Martyr, daughter of Perphirius of Penychen
Kea, reputedly a grandson of King Lot
Kentigern, Bishop and Patron of Glasgow, grandson of King Lot
Ketevan the Martyr, Queen of Kakheti, canonized by the Georgian Church (Georgian Orthodox)
Kinga of Poland, daughter of Béla IV of Hungary, wife of Boleslaus V of Poland, known as "Saint Kunigunda", "Saint Cunegunde", "Saint Kioga", and "Saint Zinga", in Polish "Święta Kinga" (Catholic)
Khosrovidukht, Princess of the Arsacid dynasty of Armenia (Catholic)
Kyneburga, Abbess, daughter of Penda, king of Mercia
Kyneswide, Abbess, daughter of Penda, king of Mercia
Ludmila, Czech Princess (Catholic, Orthodox)
Magloire of Dol, 6th century Breton Bishop, of Welsh nobility 
Magnus Felix Ennodius, Gallo-Roman aristocrat of 5th/6th centuries, Bishop of Pavia
Margaret of Hungary, daughter of Béla IV of Hungary, in Hungarian "Árpád-házi Szent Margit" ("Saint Margaret of Árpád's Line") (Catholic)
Margaret of Scotland, died 16 November 1093, granddaughter of Edmund II of England, wife of Malcolm III of Scotland, and mother of King David I of Scotland (see above), canonized in 1251 (Catholic)
Mildrith, daughter of Merewalh, king of the Magonsæte, and granddaughter of Eormenred, possibly a king of Kent
Mildburh, daughter of Merewalh, king of the Magonsæte, and granddaughter of Eormenred, possibly a king of Kent
Maria Nikolaevna of Russia, died 1918
Matilda of Ringelheim, queen consort of Heinrich I of Germany (Catholic)
Matilda of Scotland, queen consort of England (Catholic)
Matilda of Tuscany, margravine of Tuscany (Catholic)
Mlada, the youngest daughter of the Bohemian prince Boleslav I (Catholic)
Nana of Iberia, queen consort of Mirian III of Iberia (Orthodox)
Nuno Álvares Pereira, ancestor of the Portuguese House of Braganza (Catholic)
Odilia of Cologne, martyred with St. Ursula, apparently descended from British Royalty (Catholic)
Olga of Kiev, regent of son Svyatoslav I, Prince of Kiev, in Russian "Свята Ольга" ("Holy Olga")
Olga Nikolaevna, Grand Duchess of Russia
Padarn, 6th century Bishop and Abbot, reputedly nephew of Hoel Mawr, king of Cornouaille
Palladius, 5th century Irish Bishop, born into one of Gaul's noble families
Paul Aurelian, 6th century Bishop in Brittany, son of Perphirius of Penychen
Pulcheria, Byzantine empress, married emperor Marcian (Catholic and Orthodox)
Ragnhild of Tälje
Rumbold of Mechelen, early medieval Irish/Scottish missionary, reputedly son of a Scottish king
Rumwold of Buckingham, died in 662 aged 3 days, grandson of Penda, king of Mercia
Rusticus, 5th century Archbishop of Lyon, son of Aquilinus, a Gallo-Roman nobleman
Saizana, brother of King Ezana of Axum
Sæthryth, 7th century Abbess, step-daughter of Anna, king of East Anglia
Samson of Dol, 6th century Bishop and grandson of Meurig ap Tewdrig, king of Glywysing and Gwent
Seaxburh of Ely, Queen-consort of Kent, daughter of Anna, king of East Anglia
Senara, legendary Cornish saint, apparently daughter of Evan, king of Brest, and married to Breton king
Shushanik (Orthodox)
Sidonius Apollinaris, 5th century Bishop, and a Gallo-Roman nobleman 
Sidwell, 6th century Virgin, of uncertain historicity, daughter of Perphirius of Penychen
Tatiana Nikolaevna, Grand Duchess of Russia
Teneu, princess of Gododdin, mother of Kentigern
Theodora, Roman Empress, died 548, consort of Justinian
Theodora, Roman Empress, died 867, consort of Emperor Theophilos (Orthodox)
Tudwal, 6th century Breton monk, son of Hoel Mawr, a king of Cornouaille
Tibba, Abbess, niece of Penda, king of Mercia
Umbrafel, 5th century Welsh saint, son of Budic I, king of Brittany
Ursula, daughter of Dionotus, king of Dumnonia; Virgin and Martyr
Vardan Mamikonian, Armenian military leader, martyr and a saint of the Armenian Church and Catholic Church
Viventiolus, 5th century Archbishop of Lyon, son of Aquilinus, a Gallo-Roman nobleman
Vladimir Paley, Russian Prince, martyred 18 July 1918 (Orthodox)
Volusianus of Tours, 5th century Bishop of Tours, from a senatorial family 
Walstan, Prince who became a farmer, related to Aethelred the Unready and Edmund Ironside
Werburgh, Abbess of Ely, died 699, daughter of Wulfhere, king of Mercia
Wigstan, Martyr, died 839, grandson of Wiglaf and of Ceolwulf I
Wihtberht, Anchorite Benedictine, died 743, born to Wessex nobility
Wihtburh, Abbess and Princess of Kingdom of East Anglia, died 743
Wilgyth, obscure 6th century Welsh saint, possibly daughter of Perphirius of Penychen
Wilfrid, 7th century Bishop of York, born to Northumbrian nobility
Wulfhilda of Barking, 10th century Anglo-Saxon Abbess, of Wessex nobility
Wulfthryth of Wilton, Anglo-Saxon noblewoman, died 1000 
Wulvela, lived in 6th century, daughter of Perphirius of Penychen
Wynthryth, obscure Anglo-Saxon saint, possibly related to the House of Wessex

Roman Catholic Beati, Venerabili, and Servants of God

The Roman Catholic Church classifies various holy persons who have not been canonized as saints in the inferior categories of beati, venerabili, and servants of God. These titles indicate grades on the path to canonization in that church.

Benedict XIII, born to the duke of Gravina, and a Pope of the Catholic Church
Andrew Bertie,  Prince and Grand Master of the Sovereign Military Order of Malta. Fifth cousin once removed of Queen Elizabeth II. Declared Servant of God in February 2015.
Constance of Sicily, Queen of Aragon, blessed
Elena of Montenegro, Queen consort of Italy, she was made Servant of God in 2001.
Eleonora d'Este, daughter of Francesco I d'Este, Duke of Modena and his first wife Maria Caterina Farnese.
Madame Élisabeth of France, Princess of France and daughter of Louis, Dauphin of France (son of Louis XV), and youngest sibling of King Louis XVI. Her cause for canonization was open on 23 December 1953 by Pope Pius XII, in recognition of which she was accorded the title of Servant of God.
Innocent XI, born into Italian nobility, and a Pope of the Catholic Church
Isabel de Bragança Bourbon, Princess Imperial of Brazil; daughter of King Pedro II of Brazil and Queen Teresa Cristina of the Two Sicilies. Her cause for sainthood is in progress.
Isabella I of Castile, Queen of Spain, her cause of beatification has been open since 1958, but remains a controversial issue in Spain and in the Americas.
Joana of Portugal, Princess of Portugal, daughter of Afonso V of Portugal, Dominican, known in Portugal as Santa Joana Princesa ("Saint Princess Joan"), although she is beatified only
Jolenta of Poland, died 11 June 1298, daughter of Béla IV of Hungary, wife of Boleslaus the Pious of Poland, known as "Blessed Yolanda of Poland", "Blessed Yolande of Poland" and "Blessed Helen of Hungary", in Polish "Bł. Jolenta "
Louise of France, Princess of France and Carmelite nun, daughter of King Louis XV and aunt of Élisabeth of France and Clotilde of France . Her cause for canonization was open on 19 June 1873 by Pope Pius IX, in recognition of which she was accorded the title of Venerable. 
Mafalda of Portugal, daughter of Sancho I of Portugal and queen consort of Castile, known in Portugal as Rainha Santa Mafalda although she is only beatified
Margaret of Savoy, Marchioness of Montferrat
Maria Clotilde of Savoy, daughter of King Victor Emmanuel II of Italy and Queen Adelaide of Austria and Princess of Napoléon. Her cause for canonization was open on 10 July 1942 by Pope Pius XII, in recognition of which she was accorded the title of Servant of God.
Maria Cristina of Savoy, daughter of King Victor Emmanuel I of Sardinia and Queen Maria Teresa of Austria-Este and queen consort of the Two Sicilies, she was beatified on 25 January 2014 by Pope Francis
Marie Clotilde of France, Queen of Sardinia, wife of King Charles Emmanuel IV of Sardinia, and sister of Élisabeth of France. Her cause for canonization was open on 10 April 1808 by Pope Pius VII, in recognition of which she was accorded the title of Venerable. 
Pius VII, born into Italian nobility, and a Pope of the Catholic Church
Rabanus Maurus, Benedictine monk, born to a noble family 
Richeza of Lotharingia, Queen consort of Poland 
Sancha of León, a queen of León, daughter of king Alfonso V, wife of king Ferdinand I, and mother of three other kings
Sancha of Portugal, daughter of Sancho I of Portugal, known in Portugal as Rainha Santa Sancha although she is only beatified
Ignatius Spencer, son of the 2nd Earl Spencer. Great grand-uncle of Diana, Princess of Wales.
Teresa of Portugal, daughter of Sancho I of Portugal and queen consort of León, known in Portugal as Rainha Santa Teresa although she is only beatified
Zita of Bourbon-Parma, Empress of Austria and Queen of Hungary, wife of Karl I of Austria.  Her cause for canonization was opened on 10 December 2009 by Pope Benedict XVI, in recognition of which she was accorded the title of Servant of God.

Biblical royal saints

Melchizedek, the King of Salem, is venerated as a Saint and appears to be among the earliest Royalty in the Bible. Joseph is venerated as a Saint, within Christianity, with one apocryphal text (Joseph and Asenath) suggesting he may have even become Pharaoh after his work as Vizier in Egypt. Moses is also considered to have been saved, and is sometimes thought to have been a member of the Egyptian Royal family. King David of the Biblical Kingdom of Israel and his successors Hezekiah and Josiah of the southern Kingdom of Judah are traditionally considered to be Saints by Catholic teaching.

In the New Testament genealogies, Jesus Christ is a descendant of King David and has been proclaimed by the Catholic Church as King of the Universe. His mother, Mary, is also celebrated within Catholic teaching as Queen of Heaven. Within tradition, she too is a descendant of King David, as were both her parents - Sts. Joachim and Anne. Medieval traditions would include within this number some of the Apostles, as part of a broader kinship to Christ.

See also

By the Grace of God
Divine right of kings
Great Catholic Monarch
Feast of Christ the King
King Arthur
List of canonised popes
List of rulers who converted to Christianity
Prester John
Queen of Heaven
Society of King Charles the Martyr

References

Royal
Royal
Monarchs
 
Saints and martyrs